Slaven Stjepanović (Cyrillic: Славен Стјепановић; born 2 November 1987) is a Montenegrin professional footballer who plays as either an attacking midfielder or winger for First League of the Federation of Bosnia and Herzegovina club OFK Gradina.

Club career
Born in Vareš, Stjepanović spent his formation at Brčko rivals, Jedinstvo and Lokomotiva, in his native Bosnia and Herzegovina. He would go on to make his senior debuts with Montenegrin side Zeta during the 2005–06 Serbia and Montenegro SuperLiga, which would be the competition's final edition. In the inaugural 2006–07 Montenegrin First League, Stjepanović was the team's second-highest scorer with 12 goals, helping Zeta win the title. He additionally caught the attention of numerous clubs following his promising displays against Scottish champions Rangers in the 2007–08 UEFA Champions League qualifiers.

On 31 August 2007, on the last day of the summer transfer window, Stjepanović was acquired by Partizan, alongside his teammate Marko Ćetković, signing a four-year deal. He scored on his official debut for the club, coming on as a second-half substitute for Stevan Jovetić, in an eventual 4–1 away league win against Mladost Lučani on 22 September. However, only four days later, Stjepanović suffered an injury in a Serbian Cup game versus Rad, a 4–1 home success, ruling him out for almost two months. He received very little playing time after recovering, as Partizan won their first double after over a decade.

Stjepanović signed for Premier League of Bosnia and Herzegovina club FK Zvijezda 09 in January 2019. He made his debut for the club on 2 March 2019, in a 1–1 home league draw against NK Široki Brijeg. Stjepanović scored his first goal for Zvijezda on 30 March 2019, in one more 1–1 home league draw against Široki Brijeg. The club released him in April 2020.

On 27 June 2020, he joined First League of RS club FK Rudar Prijedor. In the summer 2021, he returned to his former club, FK Zvijezda 09.

International career
Stjepanović was capped four times for Montenegro U21.

Career statistics

Honours
Zeta
 Montenegrin First League: 2006–07

Partizan
 Serbian SuperLiga: 2007–08
 Serbian Cup: 2007–08

Dacia Chișinău
Moldovan Super Cup: 2011

Lokomotiv Tashkent
Uzbekistan Super League: 2016
Uzbekistan Cup: 2016

References

External links

1987 births
Living people
People from Vareš
Association football wingers
Association football midfielders
Serbia and Montenegro footballers
Montenegrin footballers
Montenegro under-21 international footballers
FK Zeta players
FK Partizan players
FK Vojvodina players
Trikala F.C. players
FC Dacia Chișinău players
Iraklis Psachna F.C. players
Vendsyssel FF players
PFC Lokomotiv Tashkent players
OFK Petrovac players
FK Zvijezda 09 players
FK Rudar Prijedor players
First League of Serbia and Montenegro players
Montenegrin First League players
Serbian SuperLiga players
Football League (Greece) players
Moldovan Super Liga players
Danish 1st Division players
Uzbekistan Super League players
Premier League of Bosnia and Herzegovina players
First League of the Republika Srpska players
Montenegrin expatriate footballers
Expatriate footballers in Serbia
Montenegrin expatriate sportspeople in Serbia
Expatriate footballers in Greece
Montenegrin expatriate sportspeople in Greece
Expatriate footballers in Moldova
Montenegrin expatriate sportspeople in Moldova
Expatriate men's footballers in Denmark
Montenegrin expatriate sportspeople in Denmark
Expatriate footballers in Uzbekistan
Montenegrin expatriate sportspeople in Uzbekistan
Expatriate footballers in Bosnia and Herzegovina
Montenegrin expatriate sportspeople in Bosnia and Herzegovina